Goworowo  is a village in Ostrołęka County, Masovian Voivodeship, in east-central Poland. It is the seat of the gmina (administrative district) called Gmina Goworowo.

The village has a population of 820.

References

External links
 Jewish Community in Goworowo on Virtual Shtetl

Villages in Ostrołęka County
Łomża Governorate
Warsaw Voivodeship (1919–1939)